Hamilton Gary Kotera (born August 7, 1984) is a Japanese professional basketball player for Ryukyu Golden Kings in Japan. He played college basketball for the Miami Hurricanes.

References

External links
Miami Hurricanes bio

1986 births
Living people
American expatriate basketball people in Argentina
American expatriate basketball people in Germany
American expatriate basketball people in Japan
American expatriate basketball people in Poland
American expatriate basketball people in Slovenia
American men's basketball players
Bambitious Nara players
Ibaraki Robots players
Los Angeles D-Fenders players
Medi Bayreuth players
Miami Hurricanes men's basketball players
Osaka Evessa players
Passlab Yamagata Wyverns players
Centers (basketball)
Susan Miller Dorsey High School alumni